Regine Wu (born 25 October 1962), known professionally as Li Jing, is a Taiwanese television show hostess and model who is notable for being Taiwan's first mainstream transgender entertainer. Due to her time spent hosting shopping channel programs on Eastern Television's Shopping Channel (ETTV Shopping), she has been referred to as the "Queen of the Shopping Channel" in Taiwan.

She also served as general manager and chief producer of Beijing Oriental Huanteng Culture company.

Career 
Shows that Li Jing has hosted include:

 Hot Queen Palace (STAR Chinese Channel)
 Hongse Fengbao (CTi Variety; production ended)
 Tian Tian Da Jing Cai (TVBS-G; production ended)
 Super Idol (Taiwan Television, SET Metro)
 Diamond Club (Taiwan Television)

References 

Living people
1962 births
Taiwanese LGBT entertainers
Taiwanese television personalities
People from Taichung
Transgender women
Transgender female models